Davara azonaxsalis is a species of snout moth in the genus Davara. It was described by Francis Walker in 1859. It is found in Brazil.

References

Moths described in 1859
Phycitinae